Richard Berg's Review of Games was a wargaming review magazine edited by Richard Berg and first published in 1980 by Simulations Publications, Inc. (SPI).

Contents
Richard Berg's Review of Games was a short, frequent, professionally produced fanzine dedicated to reviews. In 1980, Richard Berg, then working as a game designer for (SPI), started writing and editing reviews of wargames, which SPI published as Richard Berg's Review of Games. It began as a two-page standalone newsletter, published twice a month for 25 issues. SPI then converted it into a regular feature in the pages of SPI's Strategy & Tactics until late 1985. 

In the fall of 1991, Berg started up a self-published fanzine, the similarly titled Berg's Review of Games (or BROG).

Reception
Steve Jackson reviewed Richard Berg's Review of Games in The Space Gamer No. 37. Jackson commented that "This is a good effort. I just can't pick it up without thinking 'Where's the rest of the magazine?' Recommendation: Subscribe to [Strategy & Tactics], [Fire & Movement], Dragon, and [The Space Gamer] first. If you still have time and money, by all means get this."

Other recognition
Twenty-one of the twenty-five issues of Richard Berg's Review of Games are held in the "Edwin and Terry Murray Collection of Role-Playing Games, 1972-2017" at Duke University.

References

Wargaming magazines